A referendum on the Matignon Accords on New Caledonia was held in France on 6 November 1988. The accords were approved by 80% of voters, although turnout was just 36.9%. In New Caledonia it was approved by 57% of voters.

The text of the referendum was the following:

"Acceptez-vous de permettre aux habitants de la Nouvelle-Calédonie de voter pour l'autodétermination en 1998?"

"Do you agree to allow New Caledonian residents to vote for self-determination in 1998?"

Results

References

Referendums in New Caledonia
Referendums in France
1988 in France
History of New Caledonia
1988 in New Caledonia
France
1988 in international relations
November 1988 events in Oceania